Francisco José Coelho Teixeira (born 26 April 1998) is a Portuguese professional footballer who plays as a midfielder for Belenenses SAD.

Club career
Born in São Sebastião da Pedreira, Lisbon, Teixeira was developed at local Clube Oriental de Lisboa, where he debuted in the third division in 2017. At the end of the season he signed with Belenenses SAD, being put in the under-23 team. 

Teixeira played his first professional match on 28 September 2020, coming on as a 76th-minute substitute for Silvestre Varela in a 1–2 Primeira Liga home loss against F.C. Famalicão. His first goal came on 23 December in a 3–0 extra-time win over S.C. Espinho at the Estádio Nacional in the fourth round of the Taça de Portugal; on at half-time for Richard Rodrigues, he opened the score. In the next round on 14 January, he netted in the final minute of the extra 30 in a 3–2 comeback victory at AD Fafe. 

Teixeira recorded a first league goal on 17 April 2021 to conclude a 2–0 home defeat of C.S. Marítimo, within three minutes of entering the game; nine days later, after deciding the 2–1 win against Gil Vicente F.C. he was praised by manager Petit. He was rewarded with a new contract for 2025.

References

External links

1998 births
Living people
Portuguese footballers
Footballers from Lisbon
Association football midfielders
Primeira Liga players
Liga Portugal 2 players
Campeonato de Portugal (league) players
Clube Oriental de Lisboa players
Belenenses SAD players